Verchoslava Vsevolodovna (?-1222), was a Grand Princess of the Kiev by marriage to Rostislav II of Kiev, Grand Prince of Kiev (r. 1204–1206).  After the death of her spouse, she participated in church politics, and it is noted that she supported different candidates for the appointments of Bishoprics financially. She was born to Vsevolod the Big Nest.

References

Year of birth unknown
Date of death unknown
Kievan Rus' princesses
13th-century Rus' women